The Zipaquirá Province was an administrative division of the Republic of New Granada. It was created on 6 May 1852 when the Bogotá Province was subdivided. The province existed until 24 May 1855, when its territory was reintegrated into the Bogotá Province.

Geography

Physical appearance
The province was located in the northwest of the modern department of Cundinamarca, its territory corresponded approximately to provinces of Central Savanna and Rionegro. The territory was highly mountainous as the Cordillera Oriental traveled the province north to south, almost parallel to the main body of water in the region, the Bogotá River.

Territorial division
The province was divided into three cantons: Zipaquirá, Guatavita y La Palma. They were divided into parish districts and villages, as follows:

 Canton of Zipaquirá: Zipaquirá, Cajicá, Cogua, Cota, Chía, Gachancipá, Nemocón, Pacho, Sopó, Suesca, Tabio and Tocancipá.
 Canton of Guatavita: Guatavita, Gachetá, Gachalá, Guasca, Medina, Sesquilé, Upía and Cabuyaro.
 Canton of La Palma: La Palma, Caparrapí, Peña, Peñón, Topaipí and Yacopí.

Governors

See also
 Provinces of the Republic of New Granada

References

Zipaquirá
States and territories disestablished in 1855
States and territories established in 1852
Provinces of Cundinamarca Department
Provinces of the Republic of New Granada